The 1888–89 British Home Championship was the sixth international football tournament between the British Home Nations and as with all but one of the previous tournaments, Scotland won, beating England by one point to take the championship. Wales achieved third place whilst Ireland finished bottom, as they had for five of the previous competitions.

England began the strongest team, scoring ten goals in their first two matches against Wales and Ireland for just two in reply. Scotland then showed their intent with a 7–0 defeat of Ireland at home in their first game. In what would turn out to be the deciding game of the competition, England and Scotland then played out a very fast-paced match which Scotland won 3–2 despite England's home advantage. Only needing a single point against Wales in their last match, Scotland only just achieved it, finishing with a rare scoreless draw. Ireland and Wales then played the decider for last place, Wales comfortably beating the Irish 3–1.

Table

Results

Winning squad

References

British
British Home Championship
British Home Championships
Brit
1888–89 in Irish association football